An illustrated song is a type of performance art that combines either live or recorded music with projected images. It was a popular form of entertainment in the early 20th century in the United States.

Live performers (usually both a pianist and a vocalist) and music recordings were both used by different venues (vaudeville houses first and later in nickelodeons) to accompany still images projected from glass slides. This allowed the images to be painted in color by hand.  A single song was usually accompanied by 12 to 16 different images that sequentially "illustrated" the lyrics.  Projection booths used either stereopticons with two projectors or machines that combined projection of both slides and moving pictures.  Illustrated songs often preceded silent films and/or took place during reel changes, but some venues relied principally on illustrated songs alone.  At least ten thousand small theaters nationwide featured illustrated songs. Illustrated songs were seen as a valuable promotional tool for marketing sheet music. Audience participation was encouraged, and repeat performances also helped encourage sheet music sales.

Several film stars began their careers as models who illustrated lyrics through a series of song slides.  These stars included Roscoe Arbuckle, Fanny Brice, Eddie Cantor, George Jessel, Alice Joyce, Florence Lawrence, and Norma Talmadge.

The first illustrated song was "The Little Lost Child" in 1894. The song went on to become a nationwide hit selling more than two million copies of its sheet music, its success credited mainly to illustrated song performances which have been termed the first "music video."

References

External links
Music Video 1900 style on PBS Kids Go!
"Take Me Out to the Ballgame" on YouTube
"'Goodbye, Girlie, and Remember Me' An Illustrated Song" [with video], Going to the Show.

Recorded music
Popular music
Music videos
Song forms
Advertising by medium
Vaudeville tropes